The Bukit Jalil National Stadium (Malay: Stadium Nasional Bukit Jalil) in Bukit Jalil, located in the National Sports Complex to the south of the city centre of Malaysia's capital city, Kuala Lumpur, is an all-seater multi-purpose stadium for international concerts, weddings and sporting events and the home ground of the Malaysia national football team. With a capacity of 87,411, it is the largest in Southeast Asia, third largest in Asia, and the eighth largest stadium in the world.

It was officially inaugurated by the 4th Prime Minister of Malaysia, Tun Dr. Mahathir Mohamad, on 11 July 1998 ahead of the 1998 Commonwealth Games and staged the opening ceremony. Since then, it has also become the main venue for other international multi-sport events such as the 2001 Southeast Asian Games and the 2017 Southeast Asian Games, and nowadays host most Malaysian international football matches, national level football competition finals such as the Malaysia FA Cup, Malaysia Cup, athletic events and music concerts.

It was built alongside other sport venues in the National Sports Complex by United Engineers Malaysia, and designed by Arkitek FAA, Weidleplan Consulting GMBH and Schlaich Bergermann Partner. A membrane structure is used for the roof, and the most of the materials used were reinforced concrete. Before the stadium was opened, Stadium Merdeka was the national stadium of Malaysia.

The stadium, along with the National Sports Complex, is currently undergoing a major renovation at a combined cost of RM1.34 billion as a part of KL Sports City project in 2 phases. Project 1 (Phase 1) has been completed ahead and for the 2017 SEA Games in Kuala Lumpur, with a new Populous-designed facade that covers the exterior of the stadium with twisted vertical louvres which are also LED-lighted, as well as recolouring the seats to a yellow-black design and upgraded facilities. After the 2017 ASEAN Para Games, Project 2 (Phase 2) will commence, and will add a retractable roof, retractable seats, comfort ventilation and new sports and lifestyle facilities.

History 
The stadium was built on 1 January 1995 to host the 1998 Commonwealth Games. It finished exactly on 1 January 1998. After the 1998 Commonwealth Games in September, the stadium became the home stadium for the Malaysia national football team, replacing the Shah Alam Stadium and the Merdeka Stadium. It also served as the main stadium of the 2001 Southeast Asian Games, 2006 FESPIC Games, 2008 ASEAN University Games and 2017 Southeast Asian Games.

Bukit Jalil National Stadium's capacity makes it the 21st largest stadium in the world and the 9th largest football stadium in the world. It was built by United Engineers Malaysia, Bhd and designed by Arkitek FAA. It was completed three months ahead of schedule. Designed to host a multitude of events, the National Stadium is the central and most prominent sports venue at the 1.2 km2 National Sports Complex in Bukit Jalil. The stadium is considered the best stadium in Malaysia.

Malaysia's previous national stadium was the Merdeka Stadium before the Bukit Jalil sports complex was constructed. Malaysia also uses other stadiums for their football matches such as KLFA Stadium, MBPJ Stadium and the Shah Alam Stadium.

On 18 February 2020 to prevent another issue regarding the football pitch again in the future, the Malaysian Stadium Corporation (PSM) and Malaysia Ministry of Youth and Sports (KBS) plan to upgrade the pitch from cow grass to zeon zoysia grass with an estimated cost of RM10 Million. The cost included the use of specialise machine and equipment for the grass. The plan upgrade will start later this year and is expected to be completed within the next three months.

Stadium facilities 
The stadium is equipped with the following facilities:
 105 m x 68 m cow grass pitch
 9 laned 400m synthetic track
 6m x 60m warming up track
 1,500 flux floodlights
 Broadcast Studios
 Coloured Video Matrix Scoreboards
 High-tech Cathode Ray Tube Video Screen Board
 Individual "paddles" containing LED pixels at the seats

Entertainment uses 
Bukit Jalil National Stadium has been host to other important events besides football matches. Notable music artists who have performed in the stadium include:

 Jacky Cheung Live In Malaysia Concert  “友个人演唱會” 大马站，23 April 1999.
 Sammi Cheng "Shocking color" World Tour Concert 大马站, 16 March 2002.
 Jacky Cheung "Music Odyssey" World Tour Concert “音乐之旅演唱會” 大马站, 23 March 2002.
 S.H.E 奇幻樂園吉隆坡演唱會 (Fantasy Land World Tour), 6 November 2004.
 Siti Nurhaliza "Fantasia Tour Finale Live In Bukit Jalil" , 21 August 2004
 Fish Leong "Love Parade 爱的大游行" Live in Malaysia, 1 October 2005.
 David Tao  就是愛你音樂驚奇之旅 (Love Can) World Tour in Malaysia 2006, 28 October 2006.
 Rain Rain's Coming World Tour, 27 January 2007.
 The Corrs Talk on Corners World Tour and In Blue.
 A-Mei Star Tour Concert.
 Fish Leong "Today is our Valentine's Day 今天情人节" Live in Malaysia, 13 June 2009.
 Wang Lee Hom Music Man Tour 2009.
 Good Charlotte (MTV Event).
 S.H.E 愛而為一馬來西亞演唱會 (S.H.E is the One World Tour), 6 March 2010.
 Kelly Clarkson All I Ever Wanted Tour, April 2010.
 Usher OMG Tour, 7 July 2010.
 Paramore Brand New Eyes World Tour, 19 October 2010.
 G-Dragon 1st World Tour: One Of A Kind, 22 June 2013.
 Linkin Park Living Things World Tour, 19 August 2013.
 Ed Sheeran ÷ Tour, 13 April 2019.
 JJ Lin Sanctuary 2.0, 7 December 2019.
 Billie Eilish Happier Than Ever, The World Tour, 18 August 2022.
 Justin Bieber Justice World Tour, 22 October 2022. (Postponed)
Jay Chou "Carnival World Tour", 15 January 2023. 
MayDay "Fly To 2023 World Tour", 11 February 2023.    
 Blackpink Born Pink World Tour, 4 March 2023.

Sporting events 
 Athletics – 1998 Commonwealth Games, 2001 Southeast Asian Games, 2001 ASEAN Para Games, 2008 ASEAN University Games, 2009 ASEAN Para Games, 2015 ASEAN Civil Service Games, 2017 Southeast Asian Games, and 2017 ASEAN Para Games.
 Malaysia Cup finals
 Malaysian FA Cup finals
 2003 FA Premier League Asia Cup
 2007 AFC Asian Cup
 2007 Champions Youth Cup
 Manchester United 2001, 2009 Asia Tour
 2010 AFF Championship, first leg Finals
 Liverpool F.C. Asia Tour 2011
 Chelsea F.C. 2011 summer tour of Asia
 Arsenal F.C. 2011, 2012 Pre-Season Asia Tour
  Franciscan Super Cup Final 2013
 2014 AFF Championship second leg Finals
 Liverpool F.C. 2nd Asia Tour 2015
 2018 AFF Championship, first leg Finals
 2019 Malaysia FA Cup Final
 2022 FIFA World Cup qualification
 2022 AFC Cup Final

Tournament results

2004 AFF Championship

2007 AFC Asian Cup

2010 AFF Championship

2012 AFF Championship

2018 AFC U-16 Championship

2018 AFF Championship

2019 Airmarine Cup

2022 AFF Championship

Gallery

See also 
 List of stadiums
 List of stadiums in Malaysia
 List of Asian stadiums by capacity
 List of stadiums by capacity
 List of Southeast Asia stadiums by capacity
 Football Association of Malaysia
 List of association football stadiums by capacity

Notes

References 

Sports venues in Kuala Lumpur
Football venues in Malaysia
Rugby union stadiums in Malaysia
Athletics (track and field) venues in Malaysia
AFC Asian Cup stadiums
Malaysit
1998 Commonwealth Games
Stadiums of the Commonwealth Games
Multi-purpose stadiums in Malaysia
1996 establishments in Malaysia
Southeast Asian Games stadiums
Southeast Asian Games athletics venues
Sports venues completed in 1996